Fern Tree is a rural / residential locality in the local government areas (LGA) of Hobart (64%) and Kingborough (36%) in the Hobart LGA region of Tasmania. The 2016 census recorded a population of 726 for the state suburb of Fern Tree.

It is an outlying suburb of Hobart. The name Fern Tree is adapted from the common name of the plant Dicksonia antarctica (Tasmanian tree fern), which grows abundantly in the area.  Set beneath Mount Wellington, whose summit is at 1270 metres above sea level, Fern Tree is 9 km by road from Hobart's central business district.

History
Fern Tree was gazetted as a locality in 1963.

It was originally a postal station on the road to the Huon Valley, and later the site through which Hobart's water supply passed. Settled from the mid 19th century, Fern Tree and its environs have always been a major recreational area for Hobart residents.  Its many walking tracks (most notably the Pipeline Track) see tourists and locals alike appreciating the diverse flora and fauna.

The first Fern Tree Tavern was built in 1861 by John Hall. It was soon replaced by the Fern Tree Hotel, which was established by Alfred Totenhöfer, a Collinsvale farmer of East Prussian descent. Totenhöfer's hotel burnt down in the 1967 bushfires but was subsequently rebuilt as the modern Fern Tree Tavern.

Geography
Browns River forms part of the south-western boundary, while its tributaries Long Creek and Dunns Creek form parts of the south-western and north-eastern boundaries respectively.

Road infrastructure
Route B64 (Huon Road) runs through from north to south-west.

References

External links
 Fern Tree Community Association

Suburbs of Hobart
Localities of City of Hobart
Localities of Kingborough Council
Towns in Tasmania